Boucles de l'Aulne is a single-day road bicycle race held annually in May or June around Châteaulin, in the region of Brittany, France. Since 2006, the race is organized as a 1.1 event on the UCI Europe Tour.

It was previously known as Grand Prix Le Télégramme de Brest and Circuit de l'Aulne. In 2011, it became part of the French Road Cycling Cup.

Winners

Notes

References

External links
  

UCI Europe Tour races
Recurring sporting events established in 1931
1931 establishments in France
Cycle races in France